Chaetophorales is an order of green algae in the class Chlorophyceae.

Families 
 Aphanochaetaceae Oltmanns   
 Barrancaceae Caisová et al.
 Chaetophoraceae Greville   
 Fritschiellaceae Caisová & Melkonian
 Schizomeridaceae G.M.Smith   
 Uronemataceae Caisová et al.

References

 
Chlorophyta orders